The Avro 652 was a 1930s British light airliner, built by A.V. Roe and Company. It was a twin-engine, low-wing monoplane with a retractable undercarriage, and a tailwheel. Although only two were produced, it formed the basis for the successful Avro Anson.

Design and development
In 1933, Imperial Airways issued a specification to Avro, for a light airliner to transport four passengers for up to 420 mi (676 km) at a cruising speed of 130 mph (210 km/h). By August 1933, Roy Chadwick's team had produced a design study. This had to be revised when Imperial Airways changed the specification, to enable the machine to fly the Karachi-Bombay-Colombo night mail service. The amended design was accepted, and in April 1934 an order for two aircraft was issued. The first aircraft flew on 7 January 1935, and the type was certificated in March 1935.

Operational history
On 11 March 1935, the two Avro 652s were delivered to Imperial Airways at Croydon Airport. They served with Imperial Airways, mostly operating the route from Croydon to Brindisi. In 1938, they were sold to Air Service Training Ltd, a civilian company operating under Air Ministry contracts. They served with No.3 E&RFTS (Elementary and Reserve Flying Training School) as navigational trainers, at Hamble airfield. In November 1939, both aircraft were transferred to No. 11 AONS (Air Observers' Navigation School), remaining at Hamble. In March 1941, they were impressed by the Air Ministry into RAF service with No. 1 School of Photography. In July 1941, both were transferred to the Fleet Air Arm, and served with 811 Squadron at RNAS Lee-on-Solent (HMS Daedalus), until struck off charge in March 1942.

Aircraft
G-ACRM
Imperial Airways, named Avalon, later to Fleet Air Arm with serial DG655.
G-ACRN
Imperial Airways, named Avatar, then Ava, later to Fleet Air Arm with serial DG656.

Operators

Air Service Training
Imperial Airways
Royal Air Force
Fleet Air Arm

Specifications (Avro 652)

See also

References

Bibliography

Sturtivant, Ray. 1988. The Anson File. Air-Britain 

652
1930s British airliners
Low-wing aircraft
Aircraft first flown in 1935
Twin piston-engined tractor aircraft